Viktória Szabó (born 26 May 1997) is a Hungarian football midfielder who plays for German club 1. FC Saarbrücken and the Hungary national team.

Club career
In July 2016 Szabó joined 2. Bundesliga club Saarbrücken from 1. FC Lübars.

International career
At the 2016 Cyprus Cup, Szabó scored Hungary's winning goal against the Republic of Ireland from a direct free kick.

References

External links

 
 Profile at 1. FC Lübars 
 Profile at Hungarian Football Federation 
 

1997 births
Living people
Hungarian women's footballers
Expatriate women's footballers in Germany
Women's association football midfielders
Hungarian expatriate sportspeople in Germany
1. FC Lübars players
1. FC Saarbrücken (women) players
Hungary women's international footballers
Ferencvárosi TC (women) footballers
2. Frauen-Bundesliga players
Footballers from Budapest